Menegazzia fortuita is a species of foliose lichen in the family Parmeliaceae. Found in Australia, it was described as a new species in 2017 by lichenologists John Elix and Patrick McCarthy. The type specimen was collected in Morton National Park (Southern Tablelands, New South Wales) where it was found in an open rocky ridge growing on sandstone. The specific epithet fortuita refers to its discovery: "an unplanned field-stop that led to the discovery of the most recent collection which, fortuitously, helped to resolve the identity of several older, unnamed specimens". The lichen is known to occur only in a few locations in Morton National Park where it grows on sandstone in open Eucalyptus woodland. The expected results for standard chemical spot tests are cortex K+ (yellow); medulla K+ (yellow), C−, KC−; P+ (yellow-orange). Menegazzia fortuita contains several secondary chemicals: stictic acid as a major component, atranorin and constictic acid as minor components, and trace amounts of peristictic acid, cryptostictic acid, and menegazziaic acid.

References

fortuita
Lichen species
Lichens described in 2017
Lichens of Australia
Taxa named by John Alan Elix